Lunataspis is the oldest known xiphosuran. It was first formally described by David Rudkin, Graham Young and Godfrey Nolan, from fossils found in northern Manitoba, Canada in 2005; the deposit dates from the Late Ordovician, .

Discovery and species
The type species, L. aurora, was described from remains found in the Konservat-Lagerstätten deposits of the Stony Mountain Formation, central Manitoba. The specific name aurora is Latin for 'dawn' and is also eponymous with the mythological Roman goddess. 

A second species, L. borealis, was described in 2022 based on three specimens, including an adult (ROM IP 64616) and two juveniles or subadults (ROM IP 64617 and ROM IP 64618). All specimens were found in the upper member of the Gull River Formation in Kingston, Ontario.

See also

 2005 in paleontology
 2008 in paleontology
 List of xiphosurans

References

Xiphosura
Late Ordovician arthropods
Ordovician animals of North America
Ordovician Canada
Fossil taxa described in 2008